Richard A. "Sparky" Adams (August 26, 1930 – April 22, 2010) was an American football and baseball coach. He served as the head football coach at Chadron State College in Chadron, Nebraska from 1973 to 1977 and at Bemidji State University in Bemidji, Minnesota from 1978 to 1981, compiling a career college football coaching record of 3–53–1. Adams also served as the head baseball coach at the University of Dubuque from 1982 to 1985, tallying a mark of 43–59. Early in his career, he was hired by Gil Brandt to be a scout and part-time assistant for the fledgling Dallas Cowboys of the National Football League (NFL).

Head coaching record

College football

References

External links
 

1930 births
2010 deaths
Bemidji State Beavers football coaches
Carroll Pioneers football coaches
Chadron State Eagles football coaches
Dallas Cowboys scouts
Drake Bulldogs football coaches
Dubuque Spartans football coaches
Dubuque Spartans baseball coaches
Lawrence Vikings football coaches
Lawrence Vikings football players
High school football coaches in Wisconsin